Sacré Charlemagne is the third album by French singer France Gall, It was released on a 10-inch LP in December 1964.

Track listing 

France Gall albums
Philips Records albums
1964 albums